En concert : Live 1970-1971 is a live album by the French progressive rock band Ange. It was released by their ex-manager in 1978 against the will of the band.

Track listing
Side One:
"Zup"  – 02:56
"Atome"  – 17:06
Side Two:
"Opus 69"  – 03:03
"Présentation"  – 00:36
"Général Machin"  – 03:12
"Assis Sur L'univers"  – 08:20
Side Three:
"Professeur Flouze"  – 04:22
"Messaline"  – 03:14
"Cauchemar"  – 06:46
Side Four:
"Prophétie"  – 22:34

Personnel
 Lead Vocals, Hammond Organ: Christian Decamps
 Viscount Organ: Francis Decamps
 Guitar, Backing Vocals: Jean-Michel Brezovar
 Drums, Percussion: Gerard Jelsh

Additional musicians
 Rhythm Guitar on "Présentation", "Général Machin", "Assis Sur L'univers", "Professeur Flouze", "Messaline", "Cauchemar": Jean-Claude Rio
 Bass, Flute on "Présentation", "Général Machin", "Assis Sur L'univers", "Professeur Flouze", "Messaline", "Cauchemar": Patrick Kachanian
 Flute on "Zup", "Atome", "Opus 69", "Prophétie": Jean-Michel Brezovar
 Bass on "Zup", "Atome", "Opus 69", "Prophétie": Daniel Haas

References
En concert : Live 1970-1971 on amarokprog 
En concert : Live 1970-1971 on www.discogs.com

Ange albums
1977 live albums